Davis Elementary School may refer to:

 Davis Elementary School (Cheyenne, Wyoming) 
 Davis Elementary School (Marietta, Georgia)
 Davis Elementary School (Plano, Texas)
 Davis Elementary School (Santa Ana, California)
 Davis Elementary School (Southampton, Pennsylvania)
 Davis Elementary School (Greenwood, Mississippi)